John M. Morbey (born 9 August 1939) is a former British and Bermudian long jumper, triple jumper and sprinter. He competed for Great Britain in the long jump at the 1964 Summer Olympics, finished eleventh. Representing Bermuda, he won a silver medal in the long jump at the 1966 British Empire and Commonwealth Games. Morbey also placed fifteenth in the triple jump and was eliminated in the heats of the 110 yards and 4 x 110 yards relay.

Morbey was the Bermudian team manager at the 1986 Commonwealth Games, when the Bermudian authorities decided to join the boycott of the Games. The Bermudian team was a particularly late withdrawal as its athletes appeared in the opening ceremony and in the opening day of competition before the Bermuda Olympic Association decided to formally withdraw.

References

1939 births
Living people
Athletes (track and field) at the 1964 Summer Olympics
British male long jumpers
British male triple jumpers
Olympic athletes of Great Britain
Bermudian long jumpers
Bermudian triple jumpers
Bermudian male sprinters
Commonwealth Games medallists in athletics
Athletes (track and field) at the 1966 British Empire and Commonwealth Games
Commonwealth Games silver medallists for Bermuda
Place of birth missing (living people)
Medallists at the 1966 British Empire and Commonwealth Games